Neville Woodford Smith-Carington (1878 – 7 October 1933) was a British Member of Parliament.

Born at Ashby Folville Manor near Melton Mowbray, Smith-Carington was educated at Harrow College and Exeter College, Oxford.  He became a barrister at the Inner Temple.

Smith-Carington stood for the Conservative Party in Loughborough at the January 1910 United Kingdom general election, but was not elected.  He then stood in the 1923 Rutland and Stamford by-election, winning the seat, which he held until his death in 1933.

In his spare time, Smith-Carington had an interest in shire horses, and was president of the Shire Horse Society in 1931.

References

1878 births
1933 deaths
People educated at Harrow College
Alumni of Exeter College, Oxford
Conservative Party (UK) MPs for English constituencies
People from Melton Mowbray
UK MPs 1922–1923
UK MPs 1923–1924
UK MPs 1924–1929
UK MPs 1929–1931
UK MPs 1931–1935